Cercado may refer to:

Places
 Cercado Province (Beni), a province of the Beni department in Bolivia
 Cercado Province (Cochabamba), a province of the Cochabamba department in Bolivia
 Cercado Province (Oruro), a province of the Oruro department in Bolivia
 Cercado Province (Tarija), a province of the Tarija department in Bolivia
 Cercado de Lima, the proper name of the Lima District in Peru
 El Cercado, a town in San Juan Province, Dominican Republic

People
 César Cercado (born 1989), Mexican footballer